João José Gago Horta (11 November 1943 – 2022) was a Portuguese politician. A member of the Social Democratic Party, he served in the Assembly of the Republic from 2002 to 2005. His death was announced on 2 May 2022.

References

1943 births
2022 deaths
20th-century Portuguese businesspeople
21st-century Portuguese businesspeople
21st-century Portuguese politicians
Members of the Assembly of the Republic (Portugal)
Social Democratic Party (Portugal) politicians
Instituto Superior Técnico alumni
University of Lisbon alumni
People from Faro, Portugal